Wu Di (born 14 September 1991) is a professional Chinese tennis player.

Professional career

Wu has a career high singles ranking of world No. 140 achieved on April 25 2016, and a career high doubles ranking of world No. 186 achieved on April 2 2018. He has reached 24 singles finals on the ATP Challenger Tour and ITF Futures Tour, posting a record of 13–11, which includes a 1–4 record in ATP Challenger finals. Additionally, he has reached 15 doubles finals posting a record of 6–9, which includes a 3–4 record in ATP Challenger finals.

Wu participated in the 2012 Hopman Cup together with the country's best female player Li Na. Wu had the chance to try out in a much bigger stage but he could not manage to win a match, as he and team China were eliminated in the round robin stage of the tournament. 

In the Asia-Pacific Australian Open Wildcard Play-off men's final, Wu defeated Thai Danai Udomchoke 7–6(1), 6–4 to obtain his wildcard to compete in the 2013 Australian Open main draw. On his way to the final, Wu beat top seed Yuichi Sugita of Japan and No. 4 seed and compatriot Ze Zhang.  In the main draw, Wu lost to Ivan Dodig in four sets.

In late 2013, he once again qualified for the 2014 Australian Open by winning the Asia-Pacific Australian Open Wildcard Plays-off men's final, on the route to the main draw, Wu defeated countryman Zhe Li 6–3, 6–3, Yuki Bhambri of India 7–6(6), 6–4 and compatriot Ze Zhang 6–0, 6–3. However, he lost to Kenny de Schepper 5–7, 5–7, 6–7(2) in the first round of the main draw.

Wu Di earned his biggest win in his career by upsetting Denis Istomin in four sets in the Asia Pacific Davis Cup singles rubber.

ATP Challenger and ITF Futures finals

Singles: 24 (13–11)

Doubles: 15 (6–9)

Performance timeline

Singles

References

External links
 
 
 

1991 births
Living people
Chinese male tennis players
Tennis players from Wuhan
Tennis players at the 2010 Asian Games
Tennis players at the 2014 Asian Games
Tennis players at the 2018 Asian Games
Asian Games medalists in tennis
Asian Games silver medalists for China
Medalists at the 2014 Asian Games
21st-century Chinese people